Kenneth Henry Acheson (born 27 November 1957) is a British former racing driver from Northern Ireland who competed for RAM Racing in the 1983 and 1985 Formula One seasons. He completed only one of his three race starts, finishing in 12th position in the 1983 South African Grand Prix.  In 1985, he was a substitute for Manfred Winkelhock, who was killed in a sportscar race during the season.

Career

Early career
Born in Cookstown, his father, the owner of an Ulster brickworks, raced in the 1970s on motorcycles and in Formula Ford.

In 1976 he had a test in his father's old Crosslé FF1600 at the local Kirkistown Circuit and in no time was lapping within three seconds of the lap record. He entered his first race later in the year, once again at Kirkistown driving his father's FF1600 Crosslé. He acquitted himself pretty well and his father agreed to buy a new Crosslé for the 1977 season if Kenny quit smoking.

So, equipped with new machinery, he won the 1977 Northern Ireland FF1600 Championship.

Further success and Formula 1
For 1978 he moved to England to contest three of the Formula Ford series. Driving one of Alan Cornock's Royales with RMC sponsorship, he won 29 races and all three championships. He also picked up a Grovewood Award at the end of the year.

Moving up to Formula 3 in 1979, he began with a second-hand Ralt but soon ordered a new March 793 in an effort to be more competitive. However he failed to take any Championship wins though he set the fastest lap at the F3 support race for the 1979 British Grand Prix and won three non-championship races.

For 1980 he joined up with Murray Taylor Racing at Stone in Oxfordshire, to contest the Vandervell British F3 Championship. By mid-season Acheson was leading the Championship from Stefan Johansson who was driving for Project 4 Racing. But then Johansson acquired a new Ralt RT3 and closed the gap. At the last race of the Championship, Kenny made a small mistake and Johansson took the title.

Moving up to Formula 2 in 1981, he joined Docking Spitzley Racing driving a Toleman TG280. However his season ended prematurely with a big accident while racing for the lead with Michele Alboreto around the French street circuit at Pau. Running wheel to wheel, Alboreto left Acheson nowhere to go and he crashed heavily, his car ending up in a tree. With both his legs badly broken he was lucky to survive.

Nevertheless, he returned in 1982 with the Ralt Honda team, finishing seventh in the European Championship.

He was given a works F2 drive with Maurer Motorsport in 1983 and, later in the year, made his F1 debut in one of John McDonald's RAM March F1 cars with RMC sponsorship RAM March F1 car. In seven races, he failed to qualify the cumbersome car on every occasion before he finally made it onto the grid for the South African GP.

Without a drive in 1984, he returned to the RAM team as to replace Manfred Winkelhock who had tragically been killed racing a Kremer Porsche 962C at Mosport Park. With the more competitive Hart-powered RAM 03 Kenny qualified for both the Austrian and Italian GP but his funds dried up and that was the end of his F1 career.

Later career
He also had a brief flirtation with CART that year. He was entered for the Indy 500 in a Lola T800 Cosworth but didn't drive. He then crashed his March 83C Cosworth at the Meadowlands before failing to qualify for Elkhart Lake and crashing in practice at Laguna Seca in the Skoal Bandit Lola T800 Cosworth.

For the next few years he made his living in Japan where he raced for Kunimitsu Takahashi's Advan-backed Alpha team in Formula 3000 and sports cars. He won the Japanese Sportscar Championship in 1987 and on the back of that, moved back to Europe in 1988 with Sauber-Mercedes and was due to drive at Le Mans, but the team pulled out in practice.

He embarked on a full season with Sauber-Mercedes in 1989 and took a fine second at Le Mans that year driving with Mauro Baldi, the pair going on to win at Brands Hatch and Spa.

At the end of 1989 he was dropped by Sauber despite his performances and instead moved to Nissan for 1990 for the WSPC season. At Le Mans he retired the R90CK with a gearbox failure during the warm-up lap.

For Le Mans in 1991 he was part of the Silk Cut Jaguar team, finishing third in the XJR12. In 1992 he was back at Le Mans, this time with Toyota driving the Tony Southgate designed TS010 and scoring another second, though the following year he failed to finish. When the sportscar World Championship ended, Acheson switched to GT racing in Japan with the SARD team. This led to a final visit to the Sarthe in 1995, when he drove the SARD MC8R, retiring after just 14 laps when the car suffered a total brake failure.

In 1996 Acheson went to the Daytona 24 Hours with the Newcastle United football team liveried Lister Storm, sharing the car with Geoff Lees and Tiff Needell. In the dying moments of the race his Lister was destroyed in a violent crash when he was hit by a slower car. Luckily he walked away from the scene, and he also decided to walk away from racing altogether.

Racing record

Complete European Formula Two Championship results
(key) (Races in bold indicate pole position; races in italics indicate fastest lap)

Japanese Top Formula Championship results
(key) (Races in bold indicate pole position; races in italics indicate fastest lap)

Complete Formula One results
(key)

American Open-Wheel racing
(key) (Races in bold indicate pole position)

CART PPG Indy Car World Series

Complete World Sportscar Championship results
(key) (Races in bold indicate pole position; races in italics indicate fastest lap)

Complete 24 Hours of Le Mans results

Complete International Formula 3000 results
(key)

References 

1957 births
Grovewood Award winners
Living people
Formula One drivers from Northern Ireland
European Formula Two Championship drivers
Japanese Formula 3000 Championship drivers
Champ Car drivers
Racing drivers from Northern Ireland
People from Cookstown
BRDC Gold Star winners
24 Hours of Le Mans drivers
International Formula 3000 drivers
RAM Racing Formula One drivers
World Sportscar Championship drivers
Japanese Sportscar Championship drivers
TOM'S drivers
Team LeMans drivers
Forsythe Racing drivers
Nismo drivers
Mercedes-AMG Motorsport drivers
Jaguar Racing drivers
Alan Docking Racing drivers
Sauber Motorsport drivers